Big Brother Africa 1 was the first season of the reality television series Big Brother Africa produced by Endemol for M-Net. The show began on 25 May 2003 and ended on 7 September of the same year, lasting 106 days, with Cherise Makubale being crowned the very first winner of the show. Mark Pilgrim was the host.

Housemates

Abby

Abergail Brigette Plaatjies is a 25-year-old fraud consultant from Johannesburg & Durban, South Africa. Abby became the fifth person to be evicted from Big Brother Africa on 17 August 2003. 

Alex

Alexander Kasembeli Holi is a 21-year-old student from Nairobi, Kenya. Alex became the third person to be evicted from Big Brother Africa on 20 July 2003.

Bayo

Alexander Adebayo Adetomiwa Okoh is a 28-year-old economist from Oturkpo, Nigeria. Bayo became the sixth person to be evicted from Big Brother Africa on 24 August 2003.

Bruna

Bruna Tatiana Lemas Estevão is a 25-year-old singer and model from Luanda, Angola. Bruna became the first person to be evicted from Big Brother Africa on 22 June 2003.

Cherise

Cherise Makubale is a 24-year-old procurement officer from Kitwe, Zambia. Cherise won the first season of Big Brother Africa on 7 September 2003 and she is the one of only two female contestants who have ever won the show in its history.
Gaetano
Gaetano Kagwa is a 30-year-old student from Kampala, Uganda. Gaetano finished in fourth place on 7 September 2003.
Mwisho
Mwisho Mwampamba is 22 years old and self-employed. He is from Morogoro, Tanzania. Mwisho finished in second place on 7 September 2003 lasting 106 days.

In 2010 Mwisho returned as a contestant in Big Brother Africa: All-Stars. He came in 4th place lasting all 91 days; he spent a total of 197 days in the Big Brother house combined.

Currently Mwisho has the record for the most days spent in the Big Brother Africa house with 197 days.
Sammi

Samuel Kwame Bampoe is a 28-year-old radio presenter from Akropong Akwapim, Ghana. Sammi became the fourth person to be evicted from Big Brother Africa on 3 August 2003.

In 2010 Sammi competed in Big Brother Africa: All-Stars and lasted 33 days and was forced to leave due to medical issues.  Sammi has spent a total of 103 days in the Big Brother House 70 days for Big Brother Africa season 1 and 33 days for Big Brother Africa: All-Stars.

Stefan
Stefan Ludik is a 22-year-old forensic psycho-physiologist from Windhoek, Namibia. Stefan became the seventh person evicted from Big Brother Africa on 31 August 2003.
Tapuwa
Tapuwa Mhere is a 26-year-old public relations officer from Harare, Zimbabwe. Tapuwa finished in third place on 7 September 2003.
Warona
Warona Setshwaelo is a 25-year-old video editor from Gaborone, Botswana. Warona finished in fifth place on 7 September 2003.
Zein
Zein Dudha is a 27-year-old marketing manager from Blantyre, Malawi. Zein became the second person to be evicted from Big Brother Africa on 6 July 2003.

Nominations table

Notes

Swap with the Big Brother UK house
Big Brother Africa contestant Gaetano Kagwa swapped places with Big Brother UK contestant Cameron Stout. Gaetano (known as Gae), a Ugandan law student, was chosen to join Big Brother UK after passing a cocktail-making challenge. He caused upset in the Big Brother UK house when he called contestant Tania "a piggy", causing her to walk off in tears and threaten to leave the UK house for good.

Facts
The season was shown in America on the Africa Channel. It aired from November 2008 to March 2009. It was the first non-American Big Brother shown in United States.

It was the only Big Brother from the African series to use its specific eye logo design with the series using a completely different design from season 2 onwards.

References

External links

2003 television seasons
01